Phosphorus is a chemical element with symbol P and atomic number 15.

Phosphorus may also refer to:
 Phosphorus (morning star), the Morning Star, the planet Venus in its morning appearance
 Phosphorus (horse)
 Phosphorus (beetle), a genus of longhorn beetles
 Phosphorus (Thrace), a town of ancient Thrace, now in Turkey
 Phosphorus(cybercrime group) an Iranian Cybercrime group

See also

 Doctor Phosphorus, a Batman villain
 Isotopes of phosphorus
 P (disambiguation)
 Phosphorous (disambiguation), adjectival form of the element's name
 Phosphor
 Phosphorescence